The ‘’’Insurance Law Reform Act [1977]’’' was the first of several such named acts that regulated certain aspects of the insurance industry in New Zealand.

Section 4 and 5 prohibits any insurance claim declined due to any misstatement by the applicant that was not substantially incorrect as well as being not immaterial.

Section 7 prohibits any life policy being declined solely due to any misstatement of age, and where such instances occur, requires the insurance company to readjust the policy as if the correct age had been given.

Section 8 prohibits any compulsory arbitration clause in an insurance contract.

External links 
 

Statutes of New Zealand
1977 in New Zealand law
Law reform in New Zealand
Insurance law
Insurance in New Zealand